Anna "Nan" Shepherd (11 February 1893 – 27 February 1981) was a Scottish Modernist writer and poet, best known for her seminal mountain memoir, The Living Mountain, based on experiences of hill walking in the Cairngorms. This is noted as an influence by nature writers who include Robert Macfarlane and Richard Mabey. She also wrote poetry and three novels set in small fictional communities in Northern Scotland. The landscape and weather of this area played a major role in her novels and provided a focus for her poetry. Shepherd served as a lecturer in English at the Aberdeen College of Education for most of her working life.

Life
Nan Shepherd was born on 11 February 1893 at Westerton Cottage, Cults, now a suburb of Aberdeen, to John and Jane Shepherd. Shortly after her birth, the family moved to Dunvegan, Cults, the house she then lived in for most of her life. She attended Aberdeen High School for Girls and graduated from the University of Aberdeen in 1915.

Shepherd subsequently lectured for the Aberdeen College of Education. She retired from teaching in 1956, but edited the Aberdeen University Review until 1963. The university awarded her an honorary doctorate in 1964. She remained a friend and a supporter of other Scottish writers, including Neil M. Gunn, Marion Angus and Jessie Kesson.

Nan Shepherd died on 27 February 1981 at Woodend Hospital, Aberdeen.

Works

Novels
Shepherd was a major contributor to early Scottish Modernist literature. Her first novel, The Quarry Wood (1928) has often been compared to Sunset Song by Lewis Grassic Gibbon, published four years later, as they both portray restricted, often tragic lives of women in Scotland at that time. Her second novel, The Weatherhouse (1930), concerns interactions between people in a small Scottish community. Her third and final novel, A Pass in the Grampians, appeared in 1933.

Shepherd's fiction brings out the sharp conflict between the demands of tradition and the pull of modernity, particularly in the nature of women's lives in the changing times. All three novels assign a major role to the landscape and weather in small northern Scottish communities they describe.

Poetry
Shepherd was a keen hill-walker. Her poetry expresses her love for the mountainous Grampian landscape. While a student at university, Shepherd wrote poems for the student magazine, Alma Mater, but not until 1934 was a collection of her poetry, In the Cairngorms, published. This was reissued in April 2014 by Galileo Publishers, Cambridge, with a new introduction by Robert Macfarlane.

Non-fiction
Shepherd's short non-fiction book The Living Mountain, written in the 1940s, reflects her experiences walking in the Cairngorm Mountains. She chose not to publish it until 1977, but it is now the book for which she is best known. It has been quoted as an influence by prominent nature writers such as Robert Macfarlane and Joe Simpson. The Guardian called it "the finest book ever written on nature and landscape in Britain". Its functions as a memoir and field notes combine with metaphysical nature writing in the tradition of Thoreau or John Muir. The 2011 Cannongate edition included a foreword by Robert Macfarlane and an afterword by Jeanette Winterson, these were also included in the 2019 edition by the same publisher.

Essays and further poetry
In the years between the publication of In the Cairngorms and The Living Mountain, Shepherd placed articles and essays in magazines and journals, including the Aberdeen University Review and The Deeside Field. A selection of these, with several hitherto unpublished poems, were first collected as Wild Geese: A Collection of Nan Shepherd's Writing, published in 2019 by Galileo Publishers. This includes a short story, "Descent from the Cross", which appeared in the Scots Magazine in 1943.

Recognition

Nan Shepherd is commemorated in Makars' Court outside the Writers' Museum, Lawnmarket, Edinburgh. Selections for such commemoration are made by The Writers' Museum, The Saltire Society and The Scottish Poetry Library.

The best-known image of Shepherd is a portrait photograph as a young woman wearing a headband and a brooch on her forehead. Shepherd had decided to have her portrait taken at a local photography studio. Whilst sitting for it, she picked up a length of photographic film, wrapped it round her head on a whim and attached a brooch to it, making her look like a Wagnerian princess.

In 2016 this was adapted as an illustration for a new series of £5 notes issued by the Royal Bank of Scotland.

In 2017 a commemorative plaque was placed outside her former home, Dunvegan, in the North Deeside Road, Cults.

See also
People on Scottish banknotes

References

External links

Page on Nan Shepherd at slainte.org
The Nan Shepherd Prize – awarded annually since 2019
Scottish Poetry Library – a short biography and bibliography

1893 births
1981 deaths
Alumni of the University of Aberdeen
People educated at Harlaw Academy
People from Aberdeen
Scottish novelists
Scottish Renaissance
Scottish women novelists
Scottish women poets
Scottish women writers
20th-century Scottish poets
20th-century Scottish novelists
20th-century British women writers
Modernist women writers
20th-century Scottish women